Thung Phaya Thai is a khwaeng (subdistrict) of Ratchathewi District, downtown Bangkok.

History
This area formerly known as "Thung Phaya Thai", a vast field in the area of inner capital, it covers the area from the outskirts of Dusit Palace next to the Thung Som Poi (now is the location of Chitralada Royal Villa) to the Victory Monument and Phaya Thai Palace today. The next area was known as "Thung Bang Kapi" of Bang Kapi and Wang Thonglang with Huai Khwang Districts in present day.

Although it was an inner city area, but the atmosphere in the past, it was a rural countryside and fresh air. Khlong Phaya Thai, a khlong (canal) which was approximately two km (1.24 mi) long, flows through the area.

Therefore, King Rama V bought more than a thousand rai (more than 395 acres) of land here. He ordered the construction of Phaya Thai Palace in 1910 along the banks of Khlong Samsen, as well as having to build a road connecting Hua Lamphong Road (now Rama IV Road), pass Pathum Wan Road (now Rama I Road), parallel to Pra Chae Chin Road (now Phetchaburi Road), cuts across eastern railway line and Duang Tawan Road (now Si Ayutthaya Road), as far as ending at Pao Road (now Phahonyothin Road), called "Phaya Thai Road".

The king and his wife, Queen Saovabha Phongsri used the palace as a royal retreat, and the king used this place to test the cultivation as well.

In addition, in those days, this palace was also used as a place to hold  up to the Royal Ploughing Ceremony, which was a ceremony that has existed since ancient times to give the morale to farmers in the beginning of the planting season. After King Rama V passed away in 1910,  Queen Saovabha Phongsri used this place as a residence until she died in 1919.

This area was also residence to Muslims as well.

Currently, although the fields have disappeared, Khlong Phaya Thai was filled in to allow the road to be built, until it became just a small waterway in Phramongkutklao Hospital, but the name "Thung Phaya Thai" is still used for this area, and due to the numerous modifications of Bangkok administration making Thung Phaya Thai become part of Ratchathewi District to the present.

Geography
The area is bordered by neighbouring subdistricts (from north clockwise): Phaya Thai and, Sam Sen Nai in Phaya Thai District (Khlong Sam Sen is a borderline), Makkasan, and Thanon Phetchaburi in its district (Phaya Thai Road and Si Ayutthaya Road are the borderlines), Suan Chitlada in Dusit District (Northern Railway Line is a borderline).

Places

Phaya Thai Palace
Phramongkutklao Hospital
Victory Monument
Phyathai 1 Hospital
Ramathibodi Hospital
Rajavithi Hospital
Queen Sirikit National Institute of Child Health (Children Hospital)
Priest Hospital
Ratchathewi District Office
Royal Thai Army Medical Department
Department of Livestock Development
Santiphap Park
King Power Rangnam
Wat Apai Tharam (Wat Makok)
Ministry of Foreign Affairs
Ministry of Industry
Government Pharmaceutical Organization
Department of Mineral Resources
Darul Aman Mosque
Siam Commercial Bank, Thanon Phetchaburi Branch

References

Ratchathewi district
Subdistricts of Bangkok